The 1972 Talladega 500 was a NASCAR Winston Cup Series race that took place on August 6, 1972, at Talladega Superspeedway in Talladega, Alabama.

Background
Talladega Superspeedway, originally known as Alabama International Motor Superspeedway (AIMS), is a motorsports complex located north of Talladega, Alabama. It is located on the former Anniston Air Force Base in the small city of Lincoln. The track is a Tri-oval and was constructed by International Speedway Corporation, a business controlled by the France Family, in the 1960s. Talladega is most known for its steep banking and the unique location of the start/finish line - located just past the exit to pit road. The track currently hosts the NASCAR series such as the Monster Energy Cup Series, Xfinity Series, and the Camping World Truck Series.

Race report
Taking place on August 6, 1972, at Talladega Superspeedway in Talladega, Alabama, the race took three hours and twenty-two minutes.

James Hylton won the race; collecting $24,865 ($ when adjusted for inflation). This was a controversial race because NASCAR used treaded tires and it was disastrous for most teams. Hylton won because he didn't have the money to buy the new tires and used old nontreaded tires. Darrell Waltrip would lead his first laps of his NASCAR Winston Cup Series career.

The drivers who were using old tires had a huge advantage, Waltrip was one of them as was eventual winner James Hylton. Waltrip actually led 7 laps before his engine blew up. All was not bad for Waltrip who was short on funds at the time.

Many drivers were out of the race by lap 5 because of a big crash. By the day's end, only 18 cars finished the race and only two cars finished on the lead lap. One lap 188, Hylton and ARCA legend Ramo Stott battled to the finish. Hylton won the race by less than one second. Third-place finisher Bobby Allison was five laps down. It was Hylton's second and final win in NASCAR.

Notable crew chiefs at this race; Jake Elder, Harry Hyde, Dale Inman and Lee Gordon.

Qualifying

Top 10 finishers
Section reference: 
 James Hylton (No. 48), official time 3:22:09
 Ramo Stott (No. 90), 1 car length down
 Bobby Allison (No. 12), 5 laps down
 Red Farmer (No. 97), 8 laps down
 Buddy Arrington (No. 67), 9 laps down
 Ben Arnold (No. 76), 10 laps down
 Richard Petty (No. 43), 11 laps down
 Henley Gray (No. 19), 13 laps down
 Raymond Williams (No. 47), 15 laps down
 Jim Hurtubise (No. 56), 17 laps down

References

Talladega 500
Talladega 500
NASCAR races at Talladega Superspeedway